The 1849 Terwilliger House is a Registered Historic Place in the McHenry County, Illinois, village of Bull Valley. The Greek Revival house is topped with a square cupola and surrounded by a columned porch. Rumors persist that the home was once a part of the Underground Railroad.

History
Samuel Terwilliger was the third settler of Nunda Township in McHenry County, Illinois, after George Stickney and Benjamin McOmber. Arriving in 1836, he was the first farmer in the region, and his son was the first child in the township born to a settler. Terwilliger married the daughter of the neighboring property. Combining the two properties, he built a Greek Revival estate in 1849. Oral history suggests that the house may have been a stop on the Underground Railroad. The house remained in ownership of Terwilliger descendants for at least 141 years. On May 14, 1979, the house was recognized by the National Park Service with a listing on the National Register of Historic Places.

Architecture
The two-story house is square, with entrances on the east, south, and north. The house is built on a foundation of fieldstone and locally produced soft red brick. The east facade features two windows flanking the door and four regularly spaced windows on the second floor. The doors on the north and south are off center, with three windows on each side—one to the east and two to the west. The walls are built with the same soft red brick as the foundation. The Greek Revival porch dominates the southern, eastern, and northern facades with large Doric columns. The roof is hipped with a slight pitch. A cupola is at the center of the house; it is large enough to serve as a bedroom. A kitchen extension was constructed at the rear on the west side in the 1890s.

Photo gallery

References

External links

National Register of Historic Places in McHenry County, Illinois
Houses completed in 1849
Houses on the Underground Railroad
Underground Railroad in Illinois
Houses on the National Register of Historic Places in Illinois
Houses in McHenry County, Illinois
1849 establishments in Illinois